The Embanking of the tidal Thames is the historical process by which the lower River Thames, at one time a broad, shallow waterway winding through malarious marshlands, has been transformed into a deep, narrow tidal canal flowing between solid artificial walls, and restrained by these at high tide.

With small beginnings in Roman Londinium, it was pursued more vigorously in the Middle Ages. Mostly it was achieved by farmers reclaiming marshland and building protective embankments or, in London, frontagers pushing out into the stream to get more riverfront property. The Victorian civil engineering works in central London, usually called "the Embankment", are just a small part of the process. Today, over 200 miles of walls line the river's banks from Teddington down to its mouth in the North Sea; they defend a tidal flood plain where 1.25 million people work and live. Formerly, it could not be believed that the Thames was embanked by local people so the works were attributed to "the Romans".

It has been argued that land reclamation in the Thames contributed to the decay of the feudal system. Other political consequences were said to be two clauses in Magna Carta, and one of the declared causes of the English Civil War. The deepening of the Thames made it navigable by larger ships that could travel further inland: an unforeseen result was the growth of the world's largest port. Much of present-day London is recovered marshland, and considerable parts lie below high water mark. Some London streets originated as tracks running along the wall and yet today, are not even in sight of the river.

The Thames before the walls vs. the river today

In the Roman era 
The natural Thames near Roman Londinium was a river flowing through marshland, at some point infested with malarial mosquitos.  

The original site of London may have been chosen because, going up the river, it was the first place where a broad tract of dry land — chiefly gravel — came down to the stream; the modern City of London (i.e. the "Square Mile") is built on that gravel.  Below, the river flowed to the sea through broad marshes, touching firm ground at just a few points.  (It was still so even in the Victorian era, though by then the river was restrained at high tides by earthen banks.)  According to James A. Galloway

Thus much of today's urban London is built on reclaimed marshland.

Hilda Ormsby — one of the first to write a modern geographical textbook on London — visualised the scene:

 where, probably, it was shallow enough to be forded.

Some of those creeks may have been navigable. Of only three Roman ships found in London, one was dug up on the site of Guy's Hospital.

Victorian historians had a theory that the Roman-era Thames practically had no banks, but instead spread out into a vast lagoon at high tide. They used it to argue for the etymology "London" ← Llyndin (= "lake fort"). This is now discounted.  Further, the central bed of the Thames was in much the same position as it is today.  "Notwithstanding that the waterway of the Thames is very irregular, it is clear that it has kept its present line of flow the same, within narrow limits, since it first became estuarine".

More recent research suggests that in Londinium the tide was not large, and at one time non-existent.  (See below, The advancing head of tide).

During the Roman occupation the first embankation took place: building a quayside in the London Bridge area (see City of London, below).

Today 

The tidal Thames today is virtually a canal — in central London, about 250 metres wide — flowing between solid artificial walls, and laterally restrained by these at high tide. For instance, the Victorian engineer James Walker reported that, if the walls were removed

It seems the continual processes of embanking and bank-raising have greatly increased the tidal amplitude, which at London Bridge is now 6.6 m (nearly 22 feet), and the constriction and scouring have deepened the river.  Sarah Lavery and Bill Donovan of the Environment Agency warned:

Those are just the walls within the purview of that report, for they do not stop at Sheerness and Shoeburyness.

The Thames Estuary has a defended tidal floodplain of 35,000 hectares (≈135 square miles) with 500,000 properties at risk from flooding. "Other assets within this flood-plain include 400 schools, 16 hospitals, eight power stations, dozens of industrial estates, the city airport, 30 mainline railway stations and 38 underground and Docklands Light Railway stations, with this including most of the central part of the underground network".

In London the Thames flows through an alluvial plain, a geological formation which is two or three miles wide. (Very nearly, Ordnance Datum equals mean sea level.)

The walls also affect London's water table:
Hence in boreholes, groundwater levels in Battersea Park were observed to fluctuate with the tide; but just across the river in Chelsea, hardly at all. Nearly 7,000 tons of water have to be pumped from the Circle Line daily to maintain track drainage between West Kensington and Temple stations.

Tributaries. Where a tributary e.g. the River Lea meets the Thames it is necessary to cope with tidal water escaping laterally. This was done, traditionally, by providing the tributary with its own walls. The tributary walls must be carried high enough upstream to meet the rising land.  In recent times some tributaries have been given barriers against exceptional tides e.g. Barking Creek and Dartford Creek.

Who built the walls?

Early speculations 

The Thames walls puzzled historians for centuries. Early modern thinkers knew the Thames walls must be old, but could not account for their origins.

The antiquarian Sir William Dugdale amassed a collection of legal records (1662) from which it was evident there were embankments along the Thames from the Middle Ages at least:

The scientist and architect Sir Christopher Wren thought the walls were built to restrain wind-blown sand dunes, and attributed them to the Romans, for similar reasons.  The influential Victorian engineer James Walker — who was himself to lay down the lines of the Thames Embankment in central London — thought the same, adding

Walter Besant was intrigued by the mystery. He noticed several small chapels in unpeopled places along the northern wall: he surmised they had been devoted to pray for its preservation.

One of the first writers to reject the "Roman" theory was Robert Peirce Cruden. In his History of Gravesend (1843) he pointed out that the Roman authorities had no incentive to build embankments on such a scale, nor were any embanked marshlands mentioned in Domesday Book (1086). He concluded that the Thames embankments between London and Gravesend were commenced early in the 12th century by religious houses for the purpose of reclaiming marshland "by easily executed approaches", and were completed in the 13th.  Some others including the Astronomer Royal were sceptical too.

How the builders coped with 20-foot tides was not mentioned.

Flaxman Spurrell's explanation 

In his Early Sites and Embankments on the Margins of the Thames Estuary (1885) F.C.J. Spurrell described his fascination with the topic:-

Spurrell came to realise that large tides in the Thames are a relatively recent phenomenon. In the Middle Ages they were much smaller, where they existed at all. They would have posed no insuperable obstacle to land reclamation by farmers and other local people. It was those people who built the walls. As tides gradually increased over the centuries — which happened because the land was sinking — people easily raised them to match.

Sinking land, rising tide 
Spurrell had visited the excavations for the Royal Albert Dock, the Port of Tilbury and Crossness Pumping Station, and in each place he saw — 7 to 9 feet below the surface — traces of human habitation, including Roman-era pottery. This level was on top of a layer of peat, and was covered by a layer of mud.  There were multiple layers of mud and peat. Spurrell thought the mud layers ("tidal clay") must have formed when the spring tides deposited sediment (a process still observable in his day at certain river margins, called Saltings).  But peat formation must have required a long period of freedom from the tide in order for the vegetation to grow, especially since Estuary peat was often associated with the roots of yew trees ("the yew is intolerant of water and cannot live in salt").

From these data, and from sightings of fossils like estuarine shells and diatoms, Spurrell proposed that the Thames was a freshwater river originally, but had been invaded by the sea, owing to subsidence of the land.But, he said, the process was not uniform, because sometimes the land subsidence paused — maybe reversed — as was indicated by the peat layers.  He thought the tidal limit in Roman times was further down the river. The river was much shallower than today. It was "not too much to suggest that the tidal water, such as now reaches London, might then have been full five-and-twenty miles away".  As a later commentator explained, "The Romans did not build the embankments, not because they could not, but because they had no need to".

Spurrell's theory has been described as a "startling suggestion" since shown to be probably correct. "[M]ost modern authorities would agree with Spurrell (I889) that the alluvial plain was an area of marsh dissected by creeks, and that the tidal limit was further seaward than today".  (The sinking of the land with respect to sea level is best described as relative, however, since it is a complex of several factors: see The advancing head of tide, below.)

The origins of the walls 

As a specimen of his maps, Spurrell published the one shown here. It had a network of walls enclosing reclaimed marshland near Higham, Kent. The highest walls were the current tidal defences; progressively lower walls lay inland and were (he said) the old defences. The Thames at high spring tides continued to deposit mud on the Saltings but of course not on the landside areas; these were now lower. This was an instance of land reclamation by successive 'inning' of marshland (see below).

Large amounts of Romano-British pottery could be found in the Kent marshes in Spurrell's day  ("I have seen over a hundred unbroken pots at one time, and such immense quantities of broken fragments, that the new embankment of the railway there was in places made of them".)  But the levels of human occupation were feet below the present-day marsh:

Towards the end of his life he wrote:

In this waterway grew the largest port in the world.

Later research 
John H. Evans writing before the 1953 floods and using data from boreholes and similar sources found that Roman-era human occupation sites were well above the high water levels of the era, hence needed no defensive embankments. But water levels continued to rise; so that (in his words):
 Throughout the Saxon period this land surface was gradually subsiding (or the tide advancing).
 Between A.D. 900 and 1000 the high Spring tide started to overflow over the lower parts of this land surface.
 By the twelfth and thirteenth centuries the overflow of the tide reached such frequency and proportions that the first river-walls were erected to exclude it.
 Since that time these river-walls have been constantly heightened and extended, nevertheless, during the whole history of inning down to the present century, inned marshes have been lost to the sea, some permanently.

Spurrell's theory was supported by the radiocarbon dating of Thames microfossils by Robert Devoy (1979).

Building the walls: incentives and methods

Inning 
Inning was a land reclamation process in which riverside marshland was enclosed and drained. Starting from hard ground, typically farmers would build out into the marsh a pair of cross-walls, called counter walls. Then they would complete the gap by building a wall between the ends.  The strip of marshland was now enclosed, and could be drained. Such an enclosure was often called a hope, which occasionally survives in English placenames.

Drained marshland was exceptionally fertile, and might be worth two or three times (or even six times) as much as ordinary farmland, since grain could be grown and shipped to London (population 80,000), one of Europe's largest cities.  However, as the land dried, the peaty soil shrank, lowering the surface well below high water mark, and making it all the more imperative to maintain the wall.

 Traditional Thames wall in Essex obtained by "inning" riverside marshland with (inset) a sluice for draining surface runoff water at low tide
 Mature farmland won by inning, Woolwich to Erith. This map shows another pattern of old, new and cross-walls, probably initiated by the monks of Lesnes Abbey. The old walls having served their purpose are now inland.  "The oldest and strongest wall was that on which Belvedere station stands; it may belong to the XIII century". From Flaxman Spurrell's classic 1885 paper "Early sites and embankments on the margins of the Thames Estuary". Today this land supports substantial towns.

Ditches were dug to drain the enclosed marsh. The water would flow out at low tide through a sluice set in the river wall. Also, sluices were essential to allow surface runoff water to escape. Though sluices varied, they were often made from hollowed tree trunks; one design comprised a hinged flap that closed tight when the tide rose.  It was important to have a tight seal, for leakage would erode and widen any gap. A storm surge could wash the entire sluice out of the embankment; it was said to be "blown up". Captain Perry said that many inundations came through poorly designed or maintained sluices that blew up.

If the river did break through, the water would flow onto neighbours' lands too, unless the counter walls had been properly kept up. Most disputes between neighbours concerned failure to maintain in good condition the river wall, counter walls, sluices or drainage ditches.

Mature inned farmland had a characteristic pattern like a crazy chequerboard, old walls standing well inland, new walls constituting the river's tidal banks.

As far as the riverfront was concerned, the net result of inning in various places was a series of disparate river walls. In time these were gradually connected to form a continuous wall.

Materials 

Traditionally, embankments in the Thames Estuary were made from clay dug out from the marsh, faced with bundles of brushwood or rushes to prevent erosion. Routine maintenance work consumed regular quantities of coppice wood each year. Sometimes, to anchor them, walls were made from a core of driven stakes and bushes and faced with smooth clay; already in 1281 there is a record of this for Plumstead Marshes.

The height of the walls was increased over time (see below) but this caused problems with stability, slumpage and slipping. Later improvements have included facings of Kentish ragstone, tightly packed granite or sandstone to reduce erosion from navigational wash; the use of chalk instead of clay; protecting the walls with interlocking concrete blocks; and the use of gently sloping profiles to increase stability and absorb wave energy.

Saltings 
Land on the river side of the wall was called the saltings, where spring tides deposited mud. Salting was itself valuable grazing land for sheep.  Vegetation in the saltings protected the wall from wave attack; to enhance this protection, local people were sometimes banned from cutting reeds. Saltings — a natural form of flood defence — have now almost disappeared from the Thames owing to human intervention.

Political consequences 
Medievalist Bryce Lyon argued that — as in other parts of Northwest Europe e.g. Flanders and Holland — the demand for motivated labour needed for land reclamation in the Thames marshes contributed to the rise of independent farmers and the decay of the feudal system.  "This definitely is the case around the estuary of the Thames".

The advancing head of the tide 

Today, the River Thames is macro-tidal at London Bridge, and is tidal as far upriver as Teddington Lock. This was not always so.

In the last 6,000 years (at least) sea level in southeast Great Britain has been rising relative to the land, owing to sinking of the land mass by compaction, subaerial erosion, long-term tectonic movement and isostatic adjustment, as well as eustatic sea level changes and even human activity.

According to one estimate it has been doing so at an average rate of up to 13–16 cm per century; the rate has not been constant, and there have been temporary reversals. In the Roman period the London alluvial plain was an area of marsh dissected by creeks; the tidal limit may have been as far downriver as Crossness.  On that estimate there would have been no tide at London Bridge at all. Gustav Milne thought there was a small tide at Londinium, falling back to nothing in the late Roman period.  Research on this topic continues; it includes dating excavated wharves and tide mills by dendrochronology.

While river-bank dwellers might be prepared to live with occasional storm flooding, tidal high water occurs twice every 25 hours or nearly so. Thus as the tidal head advanced — and the tidal range increased — there would have come a time when the water routinely overflowed or eroded the natural river bank unless artificial banks were made.

At first, low walls sufficed (archaeologists discovered one embankment in north Kent had been only 1.2 metres high).  As water levels rose over the centuries the walls were raised. Explained Flaxman Spurell:

In response to storm surges 

That keeping up the banks cost "little exertion" may have been true in Spurrell's day, but not in the late Middle Ages. The era 1250–1450 was characterised by a deteriorating climate, storm surges and serious flooding. This topic has been researched by Hilda Grieve and particularly James A. Galloway who have examined the accounts of medieval monasteries and manors.

Storm surges, explained Galloway, are caused by They made for freak high tides in the Thames, especially if coinciding with unusually heavy land flooding (e.g. from a snow melt or a heavy rainstorm).

The river broke through the wall at Bermondsey (1294); Southwark (1311); Dagenham, and between Greenwich and Woolwich (1320s); Stepney (1323); the North Kent marshes (1328); Southwark (again), between Greenwich and Plumstead, Stone, Kent (1350s) and Stepney (again) (1369); Barking (1374-5); Dartford, Erith (1375) and elsewhere. The Black Death pandemic killed so many labourers it became harder to keep up the walls.  Later, the dissolution of the monasteries may have caused loss of local expertise with consequent wall breaches that were not repaired for decades e.g. at Lesnes Abbey (Plumstead and Erith).

These were violent incursions of water, not smooth increases. The walls were rebuilt a step higher and stronger, accordingly. Likewise, after the North Sea flood of 1953 the walls were systematically raised in many places. A height of 18 feet was recommended for agricultural land, more for built up areas.  The lines of the existing walls were generally retained, although some new walls were built to dam off creeks.

Quite often, inned lands were abandoned permanently to the river and reverted to salt marsh; they still had value for fishing, willows and reeds (for basket-making, thatching, flooring). "Horse-shoes" are evidence of this. Even on relatively modern maps, "characteristic horse-shoe shaped 'set- backs' reveal where sea or river walls had been breached, and the line of the wall set back around the deep scour hole which had resulted from the movement of water in and out through the narrow gap."  Some examples are given below.

Encroachment into the stream 

Where human activity beside the river was industrial or commercial there was an incentive not only to make banks but to encroach out into the navigable stream. Here the walls were made by making timber revetments and backfilling with rubbish. The process was repeated over time.

River frontage was valuable property.  Passengers and goods were best carried by water, which required river access and landing facilities. River access was convenient for trades that dumped offensive by-products.  Other trades that needed river access included barge-building, ship repairing and lighterage. Some retail establishments, such as marine stores and taverns for mariners, benefitted from access to the waterfront.

"As long ago as 1848", wrote Martin Bates, "Sir William Tite had deduced that nearly all the land south of Thames Street in the City of London 'had been gained from the river by a series of strong embankments'."  Evidence of such land gain is now commonplace.

Although they have not been investigated very systematically by historians, there were complaints of encroachments into the river.  Some said it ought to be illegal; others said it was illegal but law enforcement was slack. One of these, Granville Sharp, said the City's water bailiff, who was supposed to stop these encroachments, would turn a blind eye for "Fees and Christmas Compliments".

Wrote John Ehrman:

The illustration shows the river front at Narrow Street, Limehouse. Archaeologists believe that Narrow Street represents the line of the medieval river wall, which was originally built for 'inning" marshland. But the brick houses are to the river side of the street, and presumably were constructed by encroaching on the river and reclaiming the foreshore; archaeological excavations have tended to confirm this.

Specific instances are given below.

Law and administration

Marsh law 

The inhabitants of Romney Marsh in Kent were the first in England to establish amongst themselves customary laws about responsibility for keeping up embankments in a cooperative community. Later the judges applied the "custom of Romney Marsh" in other marshlands; thus it became part of the common law of England, including the Thames. A record shows it was already being applied — in Little Thurrock — in 1201.

The fundamental principle was that every occupier of land who benefitted from the existence of a wall was obliged to contribute to the effort of keeping it up, and to do so in proportion to the size of his holding.  Disputes were adjudicated by 24 jurats who had sworn to tell the truth and act righteously. A bailiff admonished people to keep up their walls; if they neglected to, he did it himself, and charged them.

Occupiers of down-sloping land that did not benefit from the wall's existence did not have to contribute. (Centuries later, the inhabitants of Hampstead were to use that principle to get off paying sewerage rates.)  Thus each level of inned marsh was a separate community or regime.

Because of a controversial interpretation of Magna Carta (next section) the law could not compel people to make new walls, only repair existing ones.

The mutual liability principle applied in cooperative communities only. In Hudson v. Tabor (1877) the defendant neglected to keep up the height of his wall. There was a very high tide, it overflowed his wall, and the floodwaters ran onto his land — and his neighbour's too, causing damage. The Court of Appeal ruled he was not bound to compensate his neighbour for the loss. This was because there was no pattern of cooperative behaviour by which each person bore his proportionate share of the cost of upkeep: in this district, each frontager looked after his own. By not establishing a cooperative regime the neighbours chose to run the risk.

Marsh law had many aspects about using the common resource for the benefit of all. Chicago-Kent law professor Fred P. Bosselman argued that marsh law ought to guide decisions of American state courts on wetlands use.

Administration 

Sometimes local communities were overwhelmed or defeated e.g. by storm surges, or internal dissensions, and needed help to repair the walls. It was the duty of the king to protect his realm from attacks and this included the violence of the sea. The English kings took to sending out commissions to repair the walls and settle disputes. These commissioners had emergency powers: they could make laws, collect taxes, adjudicate disputes and impress labour.

Their descent on a district could cause resentment, however, especially if they compelled local people to make or pay for new walls. Hence (although this interpretation is controversial) Magna Carta provided:

Because the most important point concerned land drainage, these bodies came to be called Commissioners of Sewers. (A sewer was simply a rainwater ditch for draining land. The word acquired no "sanitary" connotation until after 1815, when it was first made legal, and then compulsory, to discharge human waste into London's sewers instead of in cesspits. )

An example is Geoffrey Chaucer, who in 1390 was appointed to a commission sent to survey the walls between Greenwich and Woolwich, and compel landowners to repair them, "showing no favour to rich or poor". The commission had power to sit as Justices according to "the Law of the Marsh". Chaucer while on these duties lived at Greenwich, where he was writing his Canterbury Tales.

Eventually, the Statute of Sewers 1531 of Henry VIII made these commissions permanent. They existed in all parts of England. In 1844, a legal expert, speaking of the sewers of London, said "the metropolis is at the present moment, in the eye of the law, under the ancient and approved drainage laws of the Marsh of Romney in Kent".  The Commissioners continued to exist until 1930; their detailed records are a rich resource for historians.

Some instances 

No systematic record of the Thames walls has been kept, except perhaps those of the present day, and they are unpublished. The resources available to the historian are casual and sporadic.

Old maps can reveal the walls (and the essential drainage ditches) but the detail is poor until Joel Gascoyne's survey of East London of 1703.

Foreshore archaeology, where permitted, has yielded valuable clues, particularly in the City of London, Southwark, Wapping, Shadwell and Limehouse.  Further upstream the clues may have been obliterated by the Victorian Embankments.

Placenames offer hints e.g. Bankside; Wapping Wall; "the name Flemingges wall in 1311 attests how early foreigners were employed here [Erith]".

Artworks may be records, especially of West London, though because of artistic licence caution is needed.

Legal records go back far, though not to the time the walls were first built. The science of geology allows an understanding of what was desirable and feasible.

There may never be a comprehensive history of the Thames walls. The following are some instances.

City of London 

The City of London's Thames as depicted by 18th-century artists has a generally uniform waterfront with elevated embankments (see illustration). But this was a constriction of the natural river.

From 1973 onwards, said Gustav Milne, rescue digs were regularly undertaken along the London waterfront.

In a later paper:

The "mile-long" waterfront was the southern limit of the whole of the City of London and ran from the Fleet River in the west to the Tower of London in the east.

Excavations near London Bridge revealed that waterside encroachment, although starting in the Roman era, advanced mainly between the 11th and 16th centuries: a period of 500–600 years. As well as winning land the probable motive was to keep up the harbour and prevent erosion.

At Queenhithe in the 12th century the embanked area was extended south in five stages by nearly 32 m. According to the site's excavators,

The image of the Tower of London, from an engraving first published 1795, shows its embankment under repair, incidentally revealing it had a hollow, lath-and-plaster structure.

Westminster and Whitehall 
In 1342 the walls from around Westminster to Temple Bar were "broken and in decay by the force of the tides"; a commission was sent to view and repair them.  (Then, the Strand was the river front — as its name implies.) Thereafter these walls seem to have been built more sturdily since no more physical breaches are recorded by Dugdale; however they were sometimes overflowed by abnormally high tides. Since the area is low-lying the floods were notable. In 1235 the tide rose so high that the lawyers were brought out of Westminster Hall in boats. In 1663 — Samuel Pepys said it was "the greatest tide that ever was remembered" — all Whitehall was drowned.

 City of Westminster, 1642. Despite these seemingly robust walls, ultra-high tides went over them (Wenceslaus Hollar: Yale Center for British Art)
  Westminster Hall, seat of the higher English law courts, could be flooded chest-deep by those tides (Thomas Rowlandson and Augustus Pugin)
 Whitehall c.1650. The whole district was drowned in 1663 (Wenceslaus Hollar: Yale Center for British Art)
 Building Westminster Bridge, 1744. Notice the perfunctory river walls upstream: a disaster waiting to happen (Richard Wilson (detail): Tate Britain)

In 1762 a tide flowed into Westminster Hall covering it to a depth of 4 feet. In 1791 a tide overflowed the banks above Westminster Bridge:

South Bank

The medieval wall and Lambeth Marsh 
A commission was sent to view and repair the banks "betwixt Lambehethe and Grenewiche" in 1295, and again to Lambeth in 1444 — this time to provide for its proper governance "according to the Laws and Customes of Romeney Marsh". Lambeth itself was a marsh.

Present-day walkers along Belvedere Road and its continuation Upper Ground, SE1, cannot see the Thames, yet they are actually following the line of the medieval river wall.  Already in the Elizabethan era that wall, called Narrow Wall, no longer fronted the river but stood inland, where it served as a causeway through the marsh. Between Narrow Wall and the Thames there was a wide strip of marshy ground overgrown with rushes and willows; this is shown on Norden's map of 1593. The road continued to be called Narrow Wall until the late Victorian era.

A map of 1682 shows that Lambeth, except for the river front, remained open marsh and pasture ground intersected with many drainage ditches.  The land was not developed until Waterloo Bridge was built (1817).

 Lambeth Marsh in 1593. The orange strip is the Elizabethan river wall. The white strips are obsolete river walls, by now standing inland, and include Narrow Wall — today Belvedere Road and Upper Ground, SE1. Notice "The sluce".  (Map by John Norden, highlighted detail)
 Lambeth Marsh about 1740. The roads served as causeways through the marsh; possibly, all were former river walls or counter-walls. The red arrow denotes Narrow Wall.
 Line of medieval Narrow Wall shown on the modern OpenStreetMap.
 Tour de France cyclists riding it (Upper Ground, SE1).

The wall as a flood defence, or otherwise 

The area was always liable to flooding. In 1242 the river overflowed the Lambeth banks "drowning houses and fields for the space of six miles".

"The surface of this area is mostly below the level of high water", Sir Joseph Bazalgette told the engineering profession in 1865. The traditional sewers were supposed to discharge into the river, but could do so at low tide only. After heavy rains they backed up for days on end: sewage flooded the basements and accumulated in the streets. The area was wet and "malarious". To relieve this, Bazalgette built his Low Level [intercepting] Sewer through the district. Effluent was carried away, not by gravity now, but by steam-powered pumps. He compared the effect of pumping to elevating the whole district by 20 feet.

The Albert Embankment (completed 1868) was not meant to be a flood defence, since it was built on arches to allow vessels to enter draw docks, etc.  It was up to riverside proprietors to maintain their river walls, but many failed to make them high enough to cope with unusual tides. They said "What is the use of doing it unless their neighbours do it also?", Bazalgette told the House of Commons. The poor, whose houses stood in the low-lying districts behind, suffered most. Bazalgette saw houses where the water had reached six or seven feet above the floor.  "The people were driven out of them into the upper floors". For a few thousand pounds this could have been prevented.  Bazalgette's Metropolitan Board of Works sought legal powers to compel them.

 Lambeth Palace in 1647. Then, a fairly low embankment sufficed.  (Wenceslaus Hollar: Fisher Hollar Collection, Toronto)
 A glimpse of Lambeth Marsh in 1752 (John Boydell: Yale Center for British Art).  Caution: trees will not grow on recently drained marsh.
 Thames overflow, 1850 near Lambeth Stairs (Illustrated London News, 2 February 1850). Lambeth Stairs is shown in images 1 and 5, about where Lambeth Pier is today.
 Lambeth boatbuilders c.1853. Boatbuilding, an important local industry, did not go well with high river walls. The boats on Searle's slipway are the Leander Club's: it was their headquarters. City livery barge moored at centre. The site is now St Thomas' Hospital. (Richard John Pembery: Lambeth Archives)
 Foreshore at Lambeth Palace shortly before the Albert Embankment was made (Henry Pether, 1862, Government Art Collection)
 Lambeth waterfront 1860-5, low tide. Short ladders suffice to surmount dilapidated river wall. (Unknown photographer: Historic England)
 Flood refugees, Lambeth, 1877. The Albert Embankment was not designed for flood protection. At unusually high tides poor people were forced out of their homes.  (John Thompson, Woodburytype process)

Lambeth was badly affected by the 1928 Thames flood, people drowning in their basements.

For the Festival of Britain (1951) a large expanse of bomb-damaged riverside property was used to make a new embankment wall and create the South Bank.

In art: West London 
The embanking of the Thames in response to the rising tidal head happened too long ago to be captured in art — in most places. But in West London the tide is comparatively recent and, in parts, small even today. Hence pre-Victorian paintings often depict a river with natural banks.  Later, modest erosion defences are made, and gradually join up, as in illustrations 5 and 6. The removal of old London Bridge (1834) increased the tide upstream and caused more flooding in the upper districts.  Very few papers have been published about the waterfront riverside communities in this area.

 Fulham in 1792, old Putney Bridge in distance. Notice the natural river bank — and its erosion.  (Joseph Farington R.A., print)
 Cottage, Battersea, 1809   (John Bluck : Yale Center for British Art)
 Richmond Bridge about 1810 (Sir Augustus Wall Callcott R.A.: Yale Center for British Art)
 Millbank 1810 (David Cox: Yale Center for British Art)
 Putney about 1840. Occasional erosion defences have still not joined up.  (William Parrott: Wandsworth Collection)
 Putney about 1880. Now the title is "The Embankment, Putney, London". (George Frederick Hughes: Wandsworth Collection)

 "A Sunset", woodyard on the left (Samuel Scott: Tate)
 (Richard Redgrave R.A.: Victoria and Albert Museum)
 "The Old Red House" c.1823 (H. Pymm: YCBA)
 Cheyne Walk looking towards Battersea Bridge, 1825 (Charles Heath: YCBA)
 Barnes on the left, Hammersmith on the right (Letitia Byrne: YCBA)

East London

The struggle to make durable walls

East of the Tower were the riverside hamlets of Wapping, Shadwell, Ratcliff and Limehouse, all part of the medieval manor of Stepney. The whole area is flat and low-lying.  There was a long history of trying to reclaim the river marsh, defeated by breaches of the river wall caused by abnormal tides.

It was possible to walk from the Tower to Ratcliff along a gravel clifftop overlooking the Thames marsh. This was the Ratcliff Highway, a route already used in the Roman era.  South, however, was "a low-lying swamp flooded daily by the tide and known by the suggestive name 'Wapping in the Wose'", or simply Wapping Marsh or Walmarsh.

This close to London, perhaps the original river walls went back to Saxon times, though there is no record of it. Already in 1325 a jury — asked about the banks and ditches between St Katharine by the Tower and Shadwell — said they had been made at some remote period in order to inn 100 acres of marsh. Further, an ancient custom of Stepney Manor applied. Tenants had been given land on condition they repaired the walls. Two "wall reeves" were supposed to inspect and admonish slackers. Defaulters could be taken to the manorial court and made to pay triple damages for harm caused ("for every peny three pence"). Despite this the river had broken through the wall again and re-flooded the marsh.

In 1350 Edward III founded the Abbey of St Mary Grace's on the eastern side of Tower Hill. In this desolate area lived nobody but a hermit called John Ingram with some swans.  (He is commemorated in Wapping placenames like Hermitage Wall.) The abbey's Cistercian monks were skilled in inning and draining marsh. During the next two hundred years, working eastwards, they inned an unspecified area.

Even so, by the reign of Henry VIII, Wapping Marsh had been "longe tyme surrounded and over flowen with water". A Fleming named Cornelius Vanderdelf of Brabant was called in and he inned and recovered the marsh, described as the area lying between Ratcliff Highway and the Thames, and estimated at 130 acres.  Today the area between the Highway and the Thames is considerably more than 130 acres: possibly, further land has been reclaimed since Henry's day by a silent process of gradual encroachment.

Still there were breaches, until at last, in 1575, the Commissioners of Sewers hit on the solution of encouraging men to build houses on top of the wall itself, after which it was so well maintained that no more breaches are heard of.

Placenames reminiscent of the inning of Wapping Marsh — like Wapping Wall, Green Bank and Prusoms Island, — exist to this day. Marsh drainage needed cross walls, and these included Old Gravel Lane [now Wapping Lane] and New Gravel Lane [Garnet Street], "wherein Carts laden with Gravel from neighbouring Fields used to pass to the River Thames, where it was employed in ballasting of Ships".

The port 
As England's maritime industry developed the wall was soon enwharfed.  "As houses spread eastwards along the line of the river walls, wharves extended along the waterfront, claiming land from the river with dumps of crushed brick, crushed chalk from the lime kilns, clay, gravel and silt, laid directly on the river silts behind timber revetments".  Already in 1598, Elizabethan historian John Stow could write:

By 1600 ribbon development stretched virtually unbroken along the shore from the City to Limehouse.

Cause of Civil War
In the Stuart era the government of Charles I, short of money, thought of a scheme for making some. His Attorney-General started legal proceedings against people who owned houses built on top of the wall, saying they were trespassers. He asked for a court order to demolish the buildings, unless occupants paid rent to the government. He claimed the Thames was an arm of the sea and a navigable royal port, and that the king owned the soil of the river between the high and low water marks, and
  Since these houses had stood there for many years — had been officially encouraged — this claim was unlikely to appeal to a jury, but the government's lawyers found ways of avoiding a jury trial. Judges who disliked the government's legal case were pressured or dismissed. This sort of royal claim, repeated in other parts of the country, caused such resentment that it was mentioned in the Grand Remonstrance, leading up to the English Civil War.

Fire risk
After the Great Fire, London's building regulations required houses to be made of brick. But this area was declared exempt, because "it was believed they could not be built upon timber staves driven into the Thames mud".  The result was described by Robin Pearson in Insuring the Industrial Revolution:
By the 1760s some fire offices refused to insure anything within 100 yards of the river wall, or they quoted punitive premiums.  Boiling pitch and a saltpetre warehouse set off the great fire of Ratcliff (1794) which burnt over 600 houses. Wapping had 13 big fires, more than any other place in England.  Fire itself cured the problem, however, by gradually clearing out the risky premises.

Wapping inundations 
The reclaimed area lay below high water mark, so nothing but the wall stopped it from being overflowed twice a day.  But freak tides could surmount it, and during the 19th century did so with increasing frequency.

In 1834 a tide higher than had been known for 40 years did great damage not only in Wapping but in Shadwell, Blackwall, Rotherhithe and Blackfriars. The next year a storm surge made for a tide that overflowed Wapping High Street, down which a wherry navigated. In October 1841 something unusual was foreseen when the ebb tide was so low it grounded steamers in the Thames and made the river fordable. Then, at high tide it flowed into a hundred Wapping streets, flooding the cellars and shops and driving the inhabitants to the upper floors.

According to the Rector of Wapping, in 1874 and 1875, boats plied up and down the High Street with five feet of water beneath.

Archaeological finds 
In 2005 a team of archaeologists reported an excavation of a site behind the wall at Narrow Street, Limehouse. Finds — including a range of imported fine pottery "unprecedented in the United Kingdom" — showed the occupants must have been unusually rich.  "Meals were likely to be served on fine Mediterranean tableware and wine taken in glasses derived from the finest production centres of the age". They realised the 17th-century occupants had been retired pirates of the Caribbean, whom they were able to identify by name.

Isle of Dogs 

The Isle of Dogs — in reality, a peninsula formed by a meander in the Thames — was originally a marsh, several feet under water at high tide. At some period, probably in the Middle Ages, it was inned and drained. Given over to cattle and sheep, it was described as the richest pasture in England.  The animals grazed below high water level, defended by the river wall (see title image). Since it was part of the medieval parish of Stepney the area was better known as Stepney Marsh.  A solitary chapel, later a farmhouse, was the only building. The district kept its pastoral character until mid-Victorian times.

On 25 March 1448, owing to the fault of one "John Harpour, gentleman", who did not repair his bank opposite to Deptford Strond, the violence of tides made a 100-yard breach, drowning 1,000 acres of land. So held the jury.  The land was under the tides for 40 years.  Breaches occurred elsewhere at other times.

Millwall
The western wall was exposed to brisk winds. Some seven corn-grinding windmills were built atop it to take advantage of these. It came to be known as Millwall: at one time the Isle of Dogs itself was better known by that name. Pirates were sometimes gibbeted or hanged in chains on the walls, a warning to passing shipping.

The Isle of Dogs mirage
People standing on the Greenwich bank of the river, gazing across at the Isle of Dogs, could see a curious phenomenon. Normally, the cattle on the Isle of Dogs were not visible, because they were grazing behind the walls. But sometimes, as the tide rose, the animals seemed to float up into plain view. Some thought the Isle of Dogs itself was rising on the tide. Scientists, like Edmund Halley and Charles Hutton, explained it as a mirage — caused by moisture altering the refractivity of the atmosphere.  The cattle vanished from sight as the tide fell again.

The great breach, or Poplar Gut 
Poplar Gut was a part-severance of the neck of the Isle of Dogs. But for river wall maintenance it might have been complete.

A classic fate of geological formations like the Isle of Dogs is meander cutoff, when the river takes a short-cut across the neck of land; the old bend is left as an oxbow lake. A question is why this did not happen to the Isle of Dogs, turning Greenwich and Deptford into mere lakeside hamlets.

Samuel Pepys' diary for 23 March 1660 recorded
 The great breach Pepys saw was in the west wall. It was brought about by ballast-digging on the foreshore. By the time it could be attended to, the incoming tides had scoured out a permanent lake extending a fair way across the neck of the peninsula.  (Possibly there was a line of weakness there all along. A map of 1593 shows a small stream cutting off the meander entirely, more or less where the great breach later developed.)

In Gascoyne's map of 1703 the lake was called The Breach (in later maps, Poplar Gut). About 5 acres in extent,  people fished in it from boats. Hundreds of East Londoners went swimming there on summer mornings.  The area between the Thames and the lake is marked Old Breach, a placename suggesting it had happened there before. A 'horse-shoe" wall is inset around it; this was typical when a breach in the original wall was too difficult to repair. The resulting riverside space (or Forland) was used for the wet storage of timber. The river wall was 15-foot high and 18 feet across at its top, wider at its base.

Poplar Gut was a prominent feature until 1800, when it was absorbed by the new West India Docks.  Today the site is part of the Middle Dock ornamental feature in the Canary Wharf financial district.

 Isle of Dogs, 1703 showing the walls and (red arrows) the Foreland and Poplar Gut. The Foreland is one of the two prominent "horseshoes" made where the original bank could not be repaired.  (Joel Gascoyne, Strype's 1735 reduction: East London History Society)
 Closeup detail (from Gascoyne's An Actuall Survey of the Parish of St Dunstan Stepney alias Stebunheath, 1703)
 The fate of Poplar Gut, 1800, absorbed by the new West India Docks (red arrows).  (John Fairburn: British Library)
 Today. Canary Wharf, London's second financial district, Isle of Dogs.

Samuel Smiles thought human intervention — specifically, river wall maintenance — preserved the meander at the Isle of Dogs, because the authorities had an incentive to sustain the royal dockyard at Deptford.

Stopping Dagenham Breach 

Dagenham Breach was a break in the river wall through which the tides scoured out a large, permanent lake and flooded extensive lands. The scooped out sands threatened to block the navigation of the Thames itself. It took 12 or 14 years to fix — at ruinous expense. It was finally repaired by retired naval captain John Perry.  Perry left a written account, described as probably the earliest work on civil engineering in England.

The background was that, south of the village of Dagenham and the manor of Havering, there was the usual Thames marsh. At some period in the Middle Ages it had been inned, perhaps by Barking Abbey. Commissioners of Sewers were responsible for the Dagenham and Havering levels. In 1594 the commissioners ordered the River Beam to be inned, not for the first time. The Beam was breached again in 1621 and was repaired by Sir Cornelius Vermuyden. This left two interconnected creeks forming a rough U.

On 29 October 1707 a great tide tore a 14-foot gap through the wall. According to Captain Perry this was because the sluice — a hollow tree trunk — was defective: it "blew up". The conservative English used wooden sluices, which eventually rotted; badly made too, wrote Perry, unlike the Dutch who made them from stone lined with "tarras" (tar).

The breach could easily have been stopped quickly: by setting back a small clay "horseshoe". But "it was nobody's business to act first".  Successive tides continued to pour back and forth, widening the gap, gathering strength, cutting a channel through the clay and getting down to the sand and gravel strata, at which the scouring became so rapid the rush was overwhelming. The waters made a 100-foot gap and scoured out an inland lake — really, a tidal river — 1  miles long and 20–40 feet deep. In a fortnight 1,000 acres had been flooded.

Three separate efforts were made to fix the breach. Each had to confront the same engineering difficulty: four times a day, thousands of tons of water were going to rush through that gap, if they could.

The landowners' attempt was the earliest. Their method was to narrow the channel, by building a timber work inwards on each side  Then, they would wait for a neap tide and suddenly plug the gap by sinking derelict ships, baskets of chalk, clay and so forth. The general principle was sound, and has been used since. But they failed to appreciate that water under pressure will always find any crack, however small, leak through it, and bore it out. A torrent developed. The ships — including an old man o' war — were literally blown away. The breach was worse than before. The landowners had spent more than the value of their lands.

 A map of Dagenham Breach. Tidal waters scoured out a permanent lake. The pink area was flooded at high water. The channel on the right was an old breach, fixed by Vermuyden in 1621.  (Notice, unrelated to Dagenham Breach, two typical repair "horseshoes" marked .)
 Captain Perry's dovetailed piles (plan view), used to close the gap by building a dam across point A in the map.
 Dagenham Lake, from a Victorian engraving. Thames shipping passes on the other side of the repaired wall.

According to the Victoria County History,

A special Act of Parliament was passed. Money was raised by a levy on shipping. Tenders were invited for a contract to fix Dagenham Breach at public expense. The winner was one William Boswell, who in 1714 agreed to do the job for a success fee of £16,300 (about £3 million today). Boswell employed an improved version of the landowners' method. Instead of sinking miscellaneous ships, he used mathematically regular chests weighted with stones. Furthermore, the chests had internal doors to allow the tide to ebb and flow freely while the spaces between were being sealed. Only when sealed would the doors be shut. Despite all his efforts Boswell failed for, no matter what he did, he could never get his chests flush with bed of the channel.

A further tender was invited, which was won by Captain Perry. A lone wolf, he had been court-martialled and jailed for surrendering his ship too easily to the French, but afterwards pardoned. Perry agreed to fix the breach for £25,000.  He adopted two simultaneous principles:
 He would close the channel by driving a row of piles into its bed to create a dam. Formed with dovetails (as in image 2), the piles would interfit, hence be watertight. To reduce the water pressure on them, the piles would be no taller than was required to close the channel at neap tides. Hence there would be time to rebuild the clay river wall before the next spring tide.

 But, to further reduce the water pressure his pile dam would have to bear, Perry would make extra apertures through the river wall. Fitted with sluices, they would allow the tide to continue to ebb and flow, finally being closed only when Dagenham Breach had been plugged.

Beset with difficulties, including suppliers who sold him defective clay, a nightwatchman who failed to warn him about an extra-high tide, strikes, and cashflow problems, Perry eventually succeeded, finally plugging the gap on 18 June 1719. He got his success fee, but he was a ruined man. Parliament voted him an extra reward.

The lake remained, as did Captain Perry's house, called Dagenham Beach House. It was popular with anglers. Cabinet ministers went there annually for fish dinners. Later, the lake was made into Dagenham Dock. The Ford Motor Company built its Dagenham works to take advantage of it. Parts of it remain to this day.

The Erith explosion 
Early in the morning of 1 October 1864 a blast was heard all over London and up to 100 miles away. A gunpowder barge moored near Erith, Kent had ignited, setting off two landward powder magazines: the resulting chain explosion consumed 46  tons of gunpowder and blew the river wall into the Thames.

Fortunately it was low tide, but Lewis Moore, an engineer who chanced to live nearby, realised the gap must be plugged before the tide rose — high water was due at 1:30 p.m. A calamity was impending, worse than Poplar Gut or Dagenham Breach, for the gap was 110 feet long exposing the whole of the country to the rising tide. 
He called for help from navvies building Crossness Pumping Station and the garrison at the Woolwich Arsenal. Racing against the tide, they improvised impermeable puddled clay to fill the gap and earth-filled artillery sandbags to back it up. If the explosion had occurred even one hour later it would have been impossible to staunch the flow.

  As the tide rises, workmen race to plug the breach with improvised puddled clay and sandbags
  Having succeeded against the odds, relief shifts have time to restore the river wall

This was not the first time the wall had collapsed. In 1527, half a mile away, the river had irrupted and drowned the land for 63 years; it had to be reclaimed piecemeal by inning.

London parliamentary embankments 
Some embankments were explicitly authorised by Parliament. These were not intended as flood defences, primarily.

17th century 
The first of these was for providing a road beside the river. Called the Forty-foot way, it was proposed by Sir Christopher Wren as part of the rebuilding of London after the Great Fire. The bank between the Tower and the Temple was to be kept clear of buildings for a distance of 40 feet. An Act of Parliament was passed to that effect. However, the prohibition was ineffective. There were so many building encroachments that the Act became a dead letter, and was eventually repealed.

18th century 
The first public works embankment was made by Robert Mylne in 1767 in connection with the building of Blackfriars Bridge. Half a mile long, it started at Paul's Wharf and went in a smooth line to the Temple, fronting its riverside gardens. It was not a road, but a straightening of the river bank. Its purpose was to prevent the accumulation of malodorous silt.

In 1777 funds were authorised to make a horse-towing path above Fulham.

The Adelphi encroachment
In 1770, at a site that is today between the Strand and Victoria Embankment Gardens, but then was under the waters of the Thames, the Adam brothers laid a foundation that protruded 100 feet into the stream.  According to social campaigner Granville Sharp, they did it by illegally and furtively dumping rubbish into the river until they got a firm surface. On this foundation they built a quay with archways, and the prestigious Adelphi Terrace above and behind. Strenuously opposed by the Corporation of London, the brothers managed to get an Act of Parliament to authorise their reckless fait accompli.

  "View of the South Front of the New Buildings called Adelphi, formerly Durham Yard and that part of the Cities of London and Westminster", 1770 (Benedetto Pastorini: Yale Center for British Art). Today, the bank of Thames has moved 150 yards to the right.
  "Adelphi Terrace", 1795 (unknown artist: YCBA). Fashionably dressed people, neoclassical terrace, downstairs a bustling quay handles commercial traffic.

19th century

Millbank

In 1817 Parliament authorised a road to be made along the bank from Westminster to the newly erected Millbank Penitentiary, going through land of the Earl Grosvenor. Intended to bear heavy traffic, it was embanked over 1,500 feet by Sir Robert Smirke.

Palace of Westminster embankment
After the old Houses of Parliament burnt down in 1834 they were rebuilt under Sir Charles Barry. As the first step, a new Palace of Westminster embankment was made by constructing a coffer dam and infilling back to the existing river wall.  1,200 feet long, it was engineered by Robert Walker (1840).

Mid-Victorian embankments
Apart from miscellaneous works in the London docks and Greenwich Hospital (but these totalled more than 9 miles), no significant parliamentary embankments were sanctioned until the 1860s. There was much prevarication, and opposition by vested interests. A sanitary crisis and the urgent need to build a strategic low-level sewer somewhere along the north bank of the Thames — the only alternative was the congested Strand — stimulated the decision to authorise the first of these, the Victoria Embankment.

Executed for the Metropolitan Board of Works (chief engineer Sir Joseph Bazalgette), the total extent of these mid-Victorian embankments was about 3  miles. Bazalgette's embankments were not built for the purpose of flood defence, though they might have performed that function incidentally.  (The Thames in central London had defensive walls already.) Their purpose was to provide much needed public roads and open spaces, and to achieve a more uniform width.  Owing to encroachments over many years, in one place the river was three times as narrow as in another. In the wide places, reduced flow caused mud to accumulate — "in a state of constant fermentation".

20th century 
The last large new embankment in London was made in 1951 in connection with the Festival of Britain (see South Bank, above).

References and notes

Sources

External links 
 An Account of the Stopping of Daggenham Breach in Captain John Perry's own words
 Spurell's Early Sites and Embankments on the Margins of the Thames Estuary

Archaeology of England
Canals
Civil engineering
Common law
Dikes
Flood control in the United Kingdom
History of London
History of the River Thames
Land reclamation
Legal history
Malaria
Polders
Riparian zone